Bamberg is an impact crater in the Mare Acidalium quadrangle of Mars.  It is named after the town Bamberg in Germany. CTX images and HiRISE images from the Mars Reconnaissance Orbiter have shown that the crater contains gullies.  Martian gullies are believed to have formed through rather recent flows of liquid water.

Gullies are visible in the pictures below.  On the basis of their form, aspects, positions, and location amongst and apparent interaction with features thought to be rich in water ice, many researchers believed that the processes carving the gullies involve liquid water. However, this remains a topic of active research.  
As soon as gullies were discovered, researchers began to image many gullies over and over, looking for possible changes.  By 2006, some changes were found.  Later, with further analysis it was determined that the changes could have occurred by dry granular flows rather than being driven by flowing water. With continued observations many more changes were found  in Gasa Crater and others.  
With more repeated observations, more and more changes have been found; since the changes occur in the winter and spring, experts are tending to believe that gullies were formed from dry ice. Before-and-after images demonstrated the timing of this activity coincided with seasonal carbon-dioxide frost and temperatures that would not have allowed for liquid water.  When dry ice frost changes to a gas, it may lubricate dry material to flow especially on steep slopes.  In some years frost, perhaps as thick as 1 meter.

The crater Dein is south of Bamberg.  Between the two are a number of small craters named Gwash, Lutsk, Gaan, Chom, and Cruz.

See also
 Water on Mars
 Geology of Mars
 Martian Gullies
 Mare Acidalium quadrangle
 Climate of Mars
 Impact crater
 List of craters on Mars
 List of quadrangles on Mars
 Geological history of Mars

References

External links
High resolution video by Seán Doran of flyover of the gullied slopes of Bamberg

Impact craters on Mars
Mare Acidalium quadrangle